Richard Michael DeWine (born January 5, 1947) is an American politician and attorney serving as the 70th governor of Ohio since 2019. He previously served as the 50th Attorney General of Ohio, from 2011 to 2019, and in both houses of Congress: in the U.S. House of Representatives from 1983 to 1991 and in the U.S. Senate from 1995 to 2007. He is a member of the Republican Party.

DeWine was born in Yellow Springs, Ohio, in 1947. He graduated from Miami University with a bachelor's degree in 1969 and earned a Juris Doctor from Ohio Northern University College of Law in 1972. After graduation, DeWine worked as an assistant prosecutor for Greene County and was elected district attorney, serving one term. A lifelong member of the Republican Party, he began his political career in the Ohio Senate in 1980. He served as a U.S. representative from 1983 until 1991. In 1991 he was sworn in as the 59th lieutenant governor of Ohio, under George Voinovich. 

DeWine was elected to the United States Senate in a landslide in the 1994 Republican Revolution. He served in the Senate until his defeat by Sherrod Brown in 2006. DeWine returned to politics four years later and became the 50th attorney general of Ohio, serving from 2011 to 2019. He was elected governor in 2018. During DeWine's first term as governor, a shooting in Dayton prompted him to urge the Ohio legislature to enact new gun control measures, such as expanding background checks and harsher penalties for those in possession of unregistered firearms. In early 2020, DeWine received national attention for his COVID-19 response. He ordered the closing of dine-in restaurant service and sporting events and delegated additional resources to elderly care facilities. These decisions garnered him praise from Democrats and independents, but were criticized by some Republicans. DeWine responded to the 2022 Russian invasion of Ukraine by banning the sale of Russian Standard vodka and coordinating Ohio's efforts alongside nonprofits for resettling Ukrainian refugees. 

DeWine was reelected in the 2022 Ohio gubernatorial election.

Early life and education 

DeWine was born and raised in Yellow Springs, Ohio. He is the son of Jean Ruth (Liddle) and Richard Lee DeWine. Of Irish descent, he was raised and identifies as a Roman Catholic. DeWine earned his Bachelor of Science degree in education from Miami University in Oxford, Ohio, in 1969 and a Juris Doctor from Ohio Northern University College of Law in 1972.

Early political career 

At age 25, DeWine started working as an Assistant Prosecuting Attorney for Greene County, Ohio, and in 1976 was elected County Prosecutor, serving for four years. In 1980 he was elected to the Ohio State Senate and served one two-year term.

U.S. House of Representatives
In 1982, U.S. Representative Bud Brown of Ohio's 7th congressional district retired after 18 years in Congress; his father, Clarence Brown, Sr., had held the seat for 26 years before that. DeWine won the Republican nomination, assuring his election in November. He was reelected three more times from this district, which stretches from his home in Springfield to the Columbus suburbs. He ran unopposed in 1986 in what was regarded as a bad year for Republicans nationally. 

In 1986, Dewine was one of the House impeachment managers who prosecuted the case in the impeachment trial of Judge Harry E. Claiborne. Claiborne was found guilty by the United States Senate and removed from his federal judgeship.

Lieutenant Governor of Ohio and unsuccessful run for U.S. Senate
DeWine did not seek reelection to the House of Representatives in 1990, instead running for lieutenant governor as George Voinovich's running mate in that year's Ohio gubernatorial election. The Voinovich-DeWine ticket was easily elected.

In 1992, DeWine unsuccessfully ran for United States Senate against the former astronaut and incumbent Senator John Glenn. His campaign used the phrase, "What on earth has John Glenn done?", echoing Jeff Bingaman's slogan "What on Earth has he done for you lately?" against former astronaut Harrison Schmitt in their 1982 Senate race.

U.S. Senate 
 
In 1994, DeWine ran again for Senate, defeating prominent attorney Joel Hyatt (the son-in-law of retiring Senator Howard Metzenbaum) by a 14-point margin. DeWine was reelected in 2000, defeating gunshow promoter Ronald Dickson (161,185 votes, or 12.44%) and former U.S. Rep. Frank Cremeans (104,219 votes, or 8.05%) in the primary and Ted Celeste (brother of former Ohio governor Dick Celeste) in the general election. DeWine sat on the Senate Judiciary and Select Intelligence committees. He was the initial sponsor of the Drug-Free Century Act in 1999. He voted in favor of the 2002 Iraq Resolution authorizing the use of force against Saddam Hussein.

In the 2006 United States Senate election in Ohio, DeWine ran for reelection but lost to U.S. Representative and former Ohio Secretary of State Sherrod Brown by double digits. He received 905,644 fewer votes in 2006 than he received in 2000.

Post-Senate career
DeWine accepted positions teaching government courses at Cedarville University, Ohio Northern University and Miami University. In 2007, he joined the law firm Keating Muething & Klekamp as corporate investigations group co-chair. He also advised the Ohio campaign of John McCain's 2008 presidential bid.

Attorney General of Ohio 

On July 21, 2009, DeWine announced candidacy for attorney general of the State of Ohio. On November 2, 2010, he was elected attorney general, defeating incumbent Richard Cordray, 48–46%. As attorney general of Ohio, DeWine sent letters to drugstore chains encouraging them to discontinue the sale of tobacco products.

In the 2012 Republican presidential primary, DeWine endorsed Tim Pawlenty, then endorsed Mitt Romney after Pawlenty dropped out of the race. On February 17, 2012, DeWine announced he was retracting his endorsement of Romney and endorsed Rick Santorum. DeWine said, "To be elected president, you have to do more than tear down your opponents. You have to give the American people a reason to vote for you, a reason to hope, a reason to believe that under your leadership, America will be better. Rick Santorum has done that. Sadly, Governor Romney has not."

On November 4, 2014, DeWine was reelected as attorney general, defeating challenger David A. Pepper. He carried 83 of Ohio's 88 counties.

Legal challenge to the Affordable Care Act 
In 2015, DeWine filed a lawsuit in federal court in Ohio against a part of the Affordable Care Act (ACA). In the suit, he alleged that the ACA's Transitional Reinsurance Program (which imposed a fee "paid by all employers who provide group health insurance in the workplace", which in 2014 was $63 per covered person and in 2015 was $44 per covered person) was unconstitutional as applied to state and local governments. When he filed the suit, DeWine claimed that the fee was "an unprecedented attempt to destroy the balance of authority between the federal government and the states".

In January 2016, the federal court dismissed DeWine's suit, with U.S. District Judge Algenon L. Marbley holding that the Transitional Reinsurance Program did not violate the Constitution. DeWine appealed, but the U.S. Court of Appeals for the Sixth Circuit affirmed Marbley's dismissal of the suit.

Criminal justice 
DeWine's stated goal has been "Protecting Ohio Families". To that effect, he made it a priority to significantly reduce DNA testing turnaround times in connection with open criminal investigations. Under his predecessor, DNA testing at the Ohio Attorney General's Bureau of Criminal Investigation (BCI) took approximately four months in cases such as murders, rapes, and assaults. Under the DeWine administration, DNA test results are now returned to local law enforcement in less than a month, leading to faster apprehension of dangerous suspects.

Upon taking office in 2011, DeWine launched a special sexual assault kit (SAK) testing initiative after learning that hundreds of police departments across Ohio had thousands of untested rape kits on their evidence room shelves. DeWine invested resources to test the 13,931 previously untested rape kits over the course of his administration, which led to more than 5,000 DNA hits in the Combined DNA Index System (CODIS). These DNA matches led to the indictments of approximately 700 alleged rapists, many of whom were serial attackers, connected to cases that would never have been solved if not for the DeWine initiative.

DeWine also launched the Crimes Against Children Initiative, which paired BCI criminal investigators with seasoned prosecuting attorneys to investigate and prosecute child predators. The Crimes Against Children Initiative focuses on holding accountable those who sexually and physically abuse children, those who share and view child pornography, and those who target children online. DeWine's office also developed several task forces for the investigation and prosecutions of human trafficking throughout the state.

Opioids 
As attorney general, DeWine took steps to close down "pill mills" in Ohio that fueled the opioid epidemic. By the end of his first year in office, he had worked to close all 12 pill mills in Scioto County, considered by many to have been the national center of the prescription drug crisis. DeWine's efforts also led to more than 100 doctors and pharmacists losing their licenses for improper prescription practices. In 2013, DeWine formed a new Heroin Unit to provide Ohio communities with law enforcement, legal, and outreach assistance to combat the state's heroin problem. The Heroin Unit draws from new and existing office resources, including BCI investigative and laboratory services, Ohio Organized Crime Investigations Commission assistance, prosecutorial support, and outreach and education services. In October 2017, DeWine announced a 12-pronged plan to combat the opioid epidemic, drawing from his experience breaking up pill mills, prosecuting traffickers, supporting recovery, and advocating the importance of drug-use prevention education. In addition, he went after the pharmaceutical industry, suing opioid manufacturers and distributors for their alleged roles in fraudulent marketing and unsafe distribution of opioids that fueled the epidemic in Ohio and across the country.

Columbus Crew relocation lawsuit 
In October 2017, news reports surfaced that Anthony Precourt, the investor-operator of the soccer club Columbus Crew, was exploring the option of moving the team out of state. After the Cleveland Browns moved to Baltimore in the late 1990s, the Ohio General Assembly passed a law requiring professional sports teams that had accepted taxpayer assistance to provide an opportunity for local owners to purchase the team before initiating a move. In December 2017, DeWine sent a letter to Precourt reminding him of his obligations under Ohio law. After Precourt failed to respond, DeWine filed suit against Precourt and Major League Soccer in March 2018 to enforce Ohio law and insist upon a reasonable opportunity for local investors to buy the team. As the lawsuit played out, an investor group including Dee and Jimmy Haslam, owners of the Cleveland Browns, and the Columbus-based Edwards family announced in October 2018 they were working out the details of a deal to keep the Crew in Columbus.

Governor of Ohio

2018 election 

On May 26, 2016, DeWine announced his candidacy for governor of Ohio in 2018. He confirmed this on June 25, 2017, at the annual ice cream social held at his home in Cedarville, Ohio. On December 1, 2017, DeWine chose Ohio Secretary of State Jon Husted as his running mate. On May 8, 2018, he won the Republican primary, defeating incumbent Lieutenant Governor Mary Taylor with 59.8% of the vote. He defeated the Democratic nominee, former Consumer Financial Protection Bureau Director Richard Cordray in the general election, by a margin of about four percentage points.

Tenure

2019
On February 22, 2019, President Trump appointed DeWine to the bipartisan Council of Governors.

On August 4, 2019, a mass shooting occurred in Dayton, Ohio, that killed ten people and injured 27 others; this followed a mass shooting in El Paso, Texas by just 13 hours. At a vigil for the victims of the Dayton shooting the next day, DeWine was drowned out by a crowd chanting "Do something!"; the chant referred to the lack of legislative gun control actions on the state and federal level. On August 6, DeWine proposed to allow judges to confiscate firearms from those deemed potentially dangerous and to provide them with mental health treatment while maintaining their due process rights. Other notable aspects of DeWine's plan include expanded background checks before purchasing a firearm, increased access to psychiatric and behavioral health services, and increased penalties for illegally possessing firearms.

In October 2019, DeWine held the first meeting of a Lead Advisory Committee he appointed for the state. The committee is meant to advise him on the state's lead remediation efforts. In December 2019, he expressed his support for Ohio allowing cities to ban plastic bags, opposing two bills in the state legislature that would have forbidden it being pushed by fellow Republicans.

On December 10, 2019, during the Ohio Contractors Association's winter conference in Columbus, DeWine said that he wanted to improve the Interstate rest areas in Ohio by adding more information about Ohio's history and culture. He also said, "I'm told that our rest areas are sorry." In late December, DeWine announced that Ohio would continue to accept refugees. In a letter to Secretary of State Mike Pompeo, he wrote, "Before entering the United States, there is a lengthy, complex, and careful vetting process done by multiple federal agencies to confirm a refugee's eligibility for entrance."

2020
In January 2020, DeWine sent troops from the Ohio National Guard to Puerto Rico, which had recently experienced several earthquakes. On January 15, he signed a $30 million funding bill for Ohio farmers to prevent algal blooms, which went into effect on February 1. On January 27, DeWine signed Senate Bill 7, which gives military members and their spouses better employment opportunities by simplifying the process to transfer their occupational licenses to Ohio. In February 2020, he announced new distracted driving legislation he was sponsoring. Also in February 2020, he attracted attention for declining to share his opinion about Ohio's death penalty, at the time having "frozen all Ohio executions indefinitely as the state struggles to find lethal-injection drugs".

Informed of the public risk by Ohio Department of Health Director Amy Acton, on March 3, DeWine canceled most of the Arnold Sports Festival due to the imminent threat of the COVID-19 pandemic in Ohio, before any cases or deaths were reported. The cancellation was widely regarded as "radical" at the time but was soon seen as less so, with Axios calling DeWine "among the leading governors in the country sounding the alarm about the threat of the coronavirus" and The Washington Post calling his and Acton's response "a national guide to the crisis" and "textbook recommendations", pointing out numerous occasions when moves Ohio made were soon duplicated by other states. The Hill said DeWine had "been one of the most aggressive governors in responding to the pandemic". He has supported funding for COVID-19, signing his support of a funding bill along with 37 other governors in March 2020. On March 11, 2020, DeWine issued an order limiting visitors to Ohio assisted living facilities and nursing homes, limiting visitors to one per day per resident, with all visitors to be screened for illness. Also on March 11, he announced he was drafting legislation to limit mass gatherings in the state. DeWine barred spectators from sporting events; was first in the U.S. to shut down schools throughout his state; and, on the night before it was to take place, postponed Ohio's primary election. He directed the Ohio Department of Health to order the closing of the state's more than 22,000 food service locations and bars, except for carry-out. This was one of the earliest state closures of restaurants in response to the pandemic and drew disapproval from many high-level state Republicans. On April 1, the BBC called DeWine "quick to defer to Dr Acton for specific questions on the virus and its spread" during daily news briefings, "reminding Ohioans that the state's decisions are driven by science".

2022
During the 2022 Russian invasion of Ukraine, DeWine voiced support for Ukraine, saying that the invasion was "unacceptable, and all freedom-loving people should stand against this unprovoked invasion”. On February 26, he took action in support of Ukraine by banning the purchase and sale of Russian Standard (vodka) within the state of Ohio because the brand and distilleries are owned by a Russian corporation. Retailers were asked to "immediately pull Green Mark Vodka" (an alternate variety of Russian Standard) "and Russian Standard Vodka from their shelves". On the same day, DeWine declared February 27, 2022, a "Day of Prayer for the People of Ukraine". On March 8, he directed the Ohio Department of Job and Family Services to convene with resettlement agencies, faith-based organizations, and charities, in a summit to plan for possible resettlement of displaced Ukrainian citizens within Ohio. This summit occurred on March 17.

Political positions

Abortion

In April 2019, DeWine signed House Bill 493, known as the Ohio "Heartbeat Bill", into law, prohibiting abortion after a heartbeat is detected in a fetus, with no exceptions for cases of rape and incest, imposing one of the nation's most extensive abortion restrictions. DeWine opposes abortion. In the Senate, he was the lead sponsor of the Unborn Victims of Violence Act. In December 2020, DeWine signed a bill that said "fetal remains from surgical abortions in Ohio must be cremated or buried"; failure to do so would be a misdemeanor of the first degree.

Capital punishment
Although Catholic, DeWine has not joined the Pope and Catholic bishops in opposing the death penalty. He has not joined former governor Robert Taft, former attorney general Petro, and former Speaker of the House Householder in calling for an end to Ohio executions. Taft cited the death penalty's ineffectiveness as well as racial and geographic disparities in executions. Yet no executions have been conducted in Ohio since DeWine took office, and he has delayed executions due to "ongoing problems involving the willingness of pharmaceutical suppliers to provide drugs to the Ohio Department". , there are no legally permitted execution methods in Ohio, since the state's abolition of lethal injection.

Gerrymandering
In 2021, DeWine signed a redistricting map that favored Republicans. The map gave Republicans an advantage in 12 out of 15 districts, leaving two safely Democratic districts and one toss-up district. The map passed the Ohio legislature without any support from Democrats. Voting rights advocates called on DeWine to veto the pro-Republican redistricting map. In 2018, voters in Ohio voted in a referendum for anti-gerrymandering reform that encouraged bipartisan support for redistricting maps. The same year, DeWine pledged to honor the voters' wishes and support a redistricting process that was conducted in a bipartisan way. But in 2021 he approved the changes for 2022 onward.

Gun control

In 2004, DeWine cosponsored an amendment to renew the Federal Assault Weapons Ban. He has repeatedly received an "F" rating from the National Rifle Association. The National Rifle Association endorsed him for governor. DeWine was one of only two Republican senators to vote against the Protection of Lawful Commerce in Arms Act, which banned lawsuits against gun manufacturers, distributors and dealers for criminal misuse of their products. In the 2006 election cycle, DeWine was the first senatorial candidate to be endorsed by the Brady Campaign to Prevent Gun Violence; he displayed the endorsement on his campaign webpage. In 2019, DeWine proposed a Red Flag Law for Ohio that would allow courts to take a gun from people seen as a threats to others or themselves.

Highway safety
As U.S. senator, DeWine joined a bipartisan effort to lower the national maximum blood-alcohol limit from 0.10% to 0.08% and to require reporting of vehicle-related deaths on private property like parking lots and driveways. He sponsored legislation on determining when aging tires become unsafe.

LGBT rights
DeWine opposes same-sex marriage and sponsored the Federal Marriage Amendment to the U.S. Constitution, which would have prevented same-sex marriage. He argued in the Supreme Court in favor of prohibitions on same-sex marriage, saying that same-sex marriage bans infringe on "no fundamental right" and that states should not have to recognize same-sex couples who married in other states. DeWine was acting as attorney general against Jim Obergefell in the case Obergefell v. Hodges. The Supreme Court issued a landmark ruling against DeWine and other defendants, finding same-sex marriage bans unconstitutional.

In 2021, DeWine opposed a bill that would have banned transgender athletes from playing on sports teams that do not match their sex at birth, saying, "This issue is best addressed outside of government, through individual sports leagues and athletic associations, including the Ohio High School Athletic Association, who can tailor policies to meet the needs of their member athletes and member institutions."

Marijuana
In 2019 DeWine said: "it would really be a mistake for Ohio, by legislation, to say that marijuana for adults is just OK." In February 2020, NORML, a group advocating the legalization of marijuana, gave DeWine an "F" rating in relation to his policies.

Net neutrality
As Attorney General of Ohio, DeWine did not join the lawsuits that over 22 states filed in the months following FCC Commissioner Ajit Pai's proposal to roll back online consumer protections and net neutrality regulations.

Other
In 2020, DeWine signed a bill that forbids colleges and universities in Ohio blocking controversial speakers. In 2020, DeWine's compensation was 17th among state governors, at $159,189, compared to a maximum of $225,000 for the governor of New York and a minimum of $70,000 for the governor of Maine. The Ohio Checkbook shows that 92 employees of the Ohio state teachers retirement system, including director William Neville, equal or exceed the governor's salary.

Personal life 
DeWine lives in the Whitelaw Reid House. He and his wife Frances have been married since June 3, 1967, and have had eight children, one of whom died in an automobile accident in 1993.

Ohio Supreme Court Justice Pat DeWine is Mike DeWine's son. Former Ohio Republican Party Chairman Kevin DeWine is DeWine's second cousin. DeWine and his family own Minor League Baseball's Asheville Tourists.

Electoral history

References

External links

 Campaign website
 
 
 

|-

|-

|-

|-

|-

|-

|-

|-

|-

|-

|-

|-

1947 births
20th-century American politicians
21st-century American politicians
Activists from Ohio
American gun control activists
American people of Irish descent
American prosecutors
Catholics from Ohio
Cedarville University faculty
Claude W. Pettit College of Law alumni
County district attorneys in Ohio
Governors of Ohio
Lieutenant Governors of Ohio
Living people
Miami University alumni
Ohio Attorneys General
Ohio lawyers
Republican Party Ohio state senators
People from Cedarville, Ohio
People from Yellow Springs, Ohio
Politicians from Springfield, Ohio
Republican Party governors of Ohio
Republican Party members of the United States House of Representatives from Ohio
Republican Party United States senators from Ohio